Como-Pickton Independent School District is a public school district based in Como, Texas (USA).

Located in Hopkins County, a very small portion of the district extends into Wood County.

Como-Pickton Consolidated ISD has three schools:
Como-Pickton High School (Grades 9-12)
Como-Pickton Junior High (Grades 6-8)
Como-Pickton Elementary School (Grades PK-5)

In 2009, the school district was rated "academically acceptable" by the Texas Education Agency.

High school
Serving grades 9-12, Como-Pickton High School participates in UIL Sports which include: Boys' Sports: Cross Country, Football, Basketball, Baseball, and Track & Field. Girls' Sports: Cross Country, Volleyball, Basketball, Softball, and Track & Field. The high school also has a Varsity Marching Band and Cheerleading. CPHS has various clubs & organizations that include: National Honor Society, Student Council, FCCLA, Interact Club, gear club
, Gamer Club, SkillsUSA, Archery, Spanish Club, FFA, Book Club, Robotics, and One-Act Play.

The school, as of the 2015-2016 school year, is practicing a Project-Based style education system.

References

External links
Como-Pickton Consolidated ISD

School districts in Hopkins County, Texas
School districts in Wood County, Texas
School districts established in 1965